Nader's Western Persia campaign of 1730 was his first against perhaps his most formidable of adversaries, namely the Ottomans, where he proved triumphant in conquest. The great successes of his expedition, however, were rendered null when Shah Tahmasp II decided to take personal command of the theatre in Nader's absence, forcing a furious Nader to return and rectify the situation after forcing Tahmasp's abdication in favour of his infant son Abbas III.

The Ottoman occupation 
The Ottomans had entered the western regions of the country in the early 1720s when the Hotaki invasion of Mahmud I was launched against the Safavid state. In a decisive engagement near Gulnabad, Mahmud Hotaki managed a surprising victory against a far greater (though severely divided) Persian army. The route of the imperial army allowed him to march on the capital Isfahan which he captured after a 6-month siege that caused unheard misery and loss of life in the city. During the chaos of the Safavid overthrow, the Tsardom of Russia and the Ottoman Empire seized on this opportunity to annex as much land as they could with Ottoman Turkey taking western Persia and dividing the Caucasus up with the Russians.

Soon the Hotaki conquerors installed a new leader as king through a coup de'tat in which Mahmud I was replaced with a capable cousin of his; Ashraf. Ashraf marched west to put a halt to any further expansion by the Ottomans and to the surprise of many defeated them. The diplomatic outcome however was very much reconciliatory as the Ottomans promised recognition of Ashraf as the legitimate Shah of Persia in exchange for Ashraf's acknowledgement of Ottoman rule in their new territories in the Caucasus and western Persia.

As Nader and Ashraf came head-to-head in a conflict that would decide the fate of the country, the Ottomans wisely supported Ashraf against the Safavid loyalists as a resurgent Persia under an ambitious and talented general who would be flushed with the success of conquest would not bode well for the Ottomans hold on their newly acquired provinces. Despite support from the Turks, Nader still managed to completely destroy Ashraf's forces in numerous engagements which led to re-establishing the Safavid state under the nominal rule of Tahmasp II. Istanbul's fears had been realised as Nader would certainly turn to liberating the lost territories of the empire. The Ottomans however had been present in the west of the country for close to a decade and would prove a very formidable challenge to any efforts at their expulsion from what now formed the eastern boundaries of their empire.

Nader marches on Nahavand 
On March 9, 1730, the Persian army exited Shiraz and in a leisurely manner celebrated the new year (Nowruz), after which Nader commenced a rapid forced march westward in the hope of catching the Ottomans off balance. Reaching Ottoman-occupied town of Nahavand via Luristan, Nader put the Turks here to flight towards Hamadan, where, recovering from their initial shock and panic, they regrouped and presented themselves in the valley of Malayer to give battle in the hope of ending the Persian advance on Hamadan.

The Battle of Malayer Valley 

The Afghan and tribal opponents of Nader had been almost completely devoid of any infantry or artillery units (excluding Murche-Khort), comprised almost exclusively of excellent mounted warriors instead.

Now Nader faced an adversary who in many respects mirrored the Persian army's own composition in structure as well as constituent unit types. The Turks had drawn themselves up parallel to a stream flowing through the valley, on the other side of which Nader deployed his men into three separate divisions, placing himself in the centre. As the two armies came within musket range of each other, a general fire broke out along the entire length of the line, with the smoke created from the muskets & cannon dancing over the shallow body of water separating the two armies, obscuring the Persians and Ottomans from each other's view. Nader, under this veil of smoke, started strengthening and preparing his right wing for a bold gamble.

Nader gave the order for a sudden thrust by his right flank across the stream. The Persians appeared from the billowing cloud of smoke that had concealed their advance and threw the Ottomans, who were dazzled by the unexpected appearance of the enemy seemingly out of thin air, into disarray. An intense few hours of fighting followed, with the Ottomans attempting to salvage their left to no avail. The onslaught of the Persian right cut further into the flesh of the Turk's left wing and the killing of the chief Ottoman Bannerman caused a much demoralised army to turn tail and flee, with Persian cavalry in pursuit cutting down and imprisoning a large number of men. A clear victory was won, opening the road to Hamadan for Nader's troops.

Nader pivots north 
After liberating Hamadan along with its 10,000 imprisoned Persian soldiers, Nader gained Kermanshah, thus liberating large swathes of western Persia from Ottoman rule. Leaving behind a fortified position, he now moved his army to Azerbaijan, where he took Tabriz on August 12, crushing an army sent (too late) to reinforce Tabriz. The Turkish prisoners were treated kindly, with Nader freeing many of the Pashas, dispatching them with messages of peace to Constantinople (Istanbul). In a lightning campaign Nader had reincorporated all the main provinces of the Persian heartland.

See also
Military of the Afsharid dynasty of Persia
Ottoman–Persian War (1730–35)
Tahmasp's Ottoman Campaign
Military history of Iran
Ottoman–Persian Wars

References

Ottoman–Persian War (1730–1735)
Conflicts in 1735
1735 in the Ottoman Empire
1730 in Iran
Battles involving the Ottoman Empire
Battles involving Safavid Iran
Campaigns of Nader Shah